Fugumba was the religious center of the Imamate of Futa Jallon.

Fugomba was a place where marabouts and chiefs of the Fula people gathered to read and discuss the Quran. It was here that the decision to launch a holy war against the infidels was decided in 1725, and here that Karamokho Alfa was chosen to lead the jihad.
In 1762 the king of Sankaran, Konde Burama, attacked the new formed state and was only with difficulty prevented from taking Fugumba. 
The forces of Ibrahima Sory did not remove the threat from Sankaran until 1776.

The Council of Elders of the Futa Jallon state were based in Fugumba, acting as a brake on the Almami, who headed the state.
The Fulani built a large conical mosque in Fugumba, the first in the region. Fugumba had perhaps a thousand huts, and became the place where the newly chosen rulers of Futa-Jallon came to be consecrated.  It was a center of Islamic learning.
In the later political struggles of the state, Fugumba and Kolladé were the bases of the Alfaya faction, 
opposed to the more militarist Soriya faction that controlled Labé and Timbi.

References
Citations

Sources

History of Guinea